The 2022 Phillips 66 National Swimming Championships were held from July 26 to 30, 2022 at the William Woollett Jr. Aquatics Center in Irvine, California. Competition was conducted in a long course (50 meter) pool.

In deviation from previous editions of the Championships, the 2022 edition was conducted independent of the International Team Trials for the year, the 2022 USA Swimming International Team Trials, from which swimmers were selected to compete representing the United States at various international championships.

Men's events

Women's events

Variations in participation
From April 21 to December 31, 2022, Russian and Belarusians were banned from competing at FINA and LEN Championships due to the 2022 Russian invasion of Ukraine, and as such were allowed to compete at this competition as it was neither a FINA nor a LEN event. However, USA Swimming followed suit of the ongoing Court of Arbitration for Sport ban on Russian representation at World Championships between December 2020 and December 2022, for example Russian Andrey Minakov competed representing Alto Swim Club instead of his country. For the aforementioned ban time frame, FINA also did not count Russian times swam at any competitions, including national championships such as this one, towards world rankings nor world records.

References

External links
 Results
 Results book

Swimming competitions in the United States
United States Swimming National Championships
2022 in swimming
2022 in American sports
2022 in sports in California
July 2022 sports events in the United States